Karugorumilli is a village in West Godavari district in the state of Andhra Pradesh in India. The nearest railway station is located in town of Palacole.

Demographics
 India census, Karugorumilli has a population of 3243 of which 1647 are males while 1596 are females. The average sex ratio of Karugorumilli village is 969. The child population is 312, which makes up 9.62% of the total population of the village, with sex ratio 975. In 2011, the literacy rate of Karugorumilli village was 81.99% when compared to 67.02% of Andhra Pradesh.

See also 
 West Godavari district

References 

Villages in West Godavari district